Roger James (born 21 October 1975) is a former Australian rules footballer who played for Port Adelaide Football Club in the Australian Football League (AFL).

James debuted during Port Adelaide's inaugural AFL season and made a name for himself as a tough midfielder. The brother of former Adelaide Crows player Brett James, Roger displayed immense talent throughout his career.

After suffering a succession of groin injuries throughout the 2003 AFL season, James returned early in the 2004 AFL season, playing every game from Round Seven onwards, and was one of the best players during Port Adelaide's maiden premiership win that year.

In 2005 things took a turn for the worse though, with James' knee cartilage deteriorating in condition after Round 18, limiting him to only 10 games for the season.

In late August 2005 Port Adelaide announced that due to the condition of the knee they would not be offering James a contract for the 2006 AFL season and on medical advice, James was forced to retire at only 29 years of age – “I’ve spoken to a couple of doctors and they’ve advised me that it is in my best interests to give football away now so that further down the track I’ll be able to live a normal life,” he said.

Playing statistics

|-
|- style="background-color: #EAEAEA"
! scope="row" style="text-align:center" | 1997
|style="text-align:center;"|
| 38 || 17 || 5 || 9 || 147 || 84 || 231 || 49 || 9 || 0.3 || 0.5 || 8.6 || 4.9 || 13.6 || 2.9 || 0.5
|-
! scope="row" style="text-align:center" | 1998
|style="text-align:center;"|
| 38 || 6 || 5 || 2 || 37 || 31 || 68 || 14 || 7 || 0.8 || 0.3 || 6.2 || 5.2 || 11.3 || 2.3 || 1.2
|- style="background-color: #EAEAEA"
! scope="row" style="text-align:center" | 1999
|style="text-align:center;"|
| 38 || 10 || 5 || 1 || 69 || 40 || 109 || 24 || 9 || 0.5 || 0.1 || 6.9 || 4.0 || 10.9 || 2.4 || 0.9
|-
! scope="row" style="text-align:center" | 2000
|style="text-align:center;"|
| 38 || 20 || 17 || 15 || 230 || 164 || 394 || 73 || 41 || 0.9 || 0.8 || 11.5 || 8.2 || 19.7 || 3.7 || 2.1
|- style="background-color: #EAEAEA"
! scope="row" style="text-align:center" | 2001
|style="text-align:center;"|
| 38 || 24 || 19 || 9 || 241 || 200 || 441 || 122 || 35 || 0.8 || 0.4 || 10.0 || 8.3 || 18.4 || 5.1 || 1.5
|-
! scope="row" style="text-align:center" | 2002
|style="text-align:center;"|
| 38 || 24 || 13 || 6 || 244 || 192 || 436 || 86 || 54 || 0.5 || 0.3 || 10.2 || 8.0 || 18.2 || 3.6 || 2.3
|- style="background-color: #EAEAEA"
! scope="row" style="text-align:center" | 2003
|style="text-align:center;"|
| 38 || 17 || 12 || 6 || 219 || 108 || 327 || 76 || 38 || 0.7 || 0.4 || 12.9 || 6.4 || 19.2 || 4.5 || 2.2
|-
! scope="row" style="text-align:center;" | 2004
|style="text-align:center;"|
| 38 || 19 || 9 || 6 || 212 || 141 || 353 || 58 || 52 || 0.5 || 0.3 || 11.2 || 7.4 || 18.6 || 3.1 || 2.7
|- style="background-color: #EAEAEA"
! scope="row" style="text-align:center" | 2005
|style="text-align:center;"|
| 38 || 10 || 2 || 3 || 82 || 47 || 129 || 35 || 19 || 0.2 || 0.3 || 8.2 || 4.7 || 12.9 || 3.5 || 1.9
|- class="sortbottom"
! colspan=3| Career
! 147
! 87
! 57
! 1481
! 1007
! 2488
! 537
! 264
! 0.6
! 0.4
! 10.1
! 6.9
! 16.9
! 3.7
! 1.8
|}

Notes

External links 

Port Adelaide Football Club players
Port Adelaide Football Club Premiership players
Port Adelaide Football Club players (all competitions)
1975 births
Living people
Norwood Football Club players
Australian rules footballers from South Australia
South Australian Football Hall of Fame inductees
One-time VFL/AFL Premiership players